Wiązownica-Kolonia  is a colony in the administrative district of Gmina Staszów, within Staszów County, Świętokrzyskie Voivodeship, in south-central Poland.

The village has a population of  615.

Demography 
According to the 2002 Poland census, there were 497 people residing in Wiązownica-Kolonia village, of whom 51.1% were male and 48.9% were female. In the village, the population was spread out, with 25.4% under the age of 18, 33.4% from 18 to 44, 20.3% from 45 to 64, and 20.9% who were 65 years of age or older.
 Figure 1. Population pyramid of village in 2002 — by age group and sex

References

Villages in Staszów County